is a Japanese footballer.

College career
Hashii represented the Hinds Community College in 2019, scoring seven goals in 12 games.

Career statistics

Club
.

Notes

References

External links
 Morrison Hashii at the Hinds Community College

2001 births
Living people
Association football people from Tottori Prefecture
Hinds Community College alumni
Japanese footballers
Japanese expatriate footballers
Association football forwards
Singapore Premier League players
Gainare Tottori players
Albirex Niigata Singapore FC players
Japanese expatriate sportspeople in the United States
Expatriate soccer players in the United States
Japanese expatriate sportspeople in the United Arab Emirates
Expatriate footballers in the United Arab Emirates
Japanese expatriate sportspeople in Singapore
Expatriate footballers in Singapore